Guillermo Pérez Roldán was the defending champion, but did not participate this year.

Horst Skoff won the tournament, beating Bruno Orešar in the final, 6–3, 2–6, 6–2.

Seeds

  Tore Meinecke (second round)
  Guillermo Vilas (second round)
  Fernando Luna (first round)
  Claudio Pistolesi (first round)
  Christian Miniussi (first round)
  Bruno Orešar (final)
  Alberto Tous (first round)
  Horst Skoff (champion)

Draw

Finals

Top half

Bottom half

External links
 Main draw

ATP Athens Open
1988 Grand Prix (tennis)